Charles Palissot de Montenoy (3 January 1730 – 15 June 1814) was an 18th-century French playwright, admirer and disciple of Voltaire and Antoine de Rivarol. Paradoxically, he was often denounced as a Counter-Enlightenment opponent to the parti philosophique, especially for his criticism 
of Diderot and the Encyclopédistes. He is the author of the comedy, Les Philosophes, which was a huge success and caused a scandal in 1760.

Works 
Palissot's works were collected in three more or less complete editions: one published in Liege in 1777 at Plomteux, 6 vol. in-8° to which a seventh volume was added in 1779 with the publication of the second edition ; the third by the printingpress of Monsieur, in 1788, 4 volumes in-8° ; the last one published under the eyes of the author, in Paris, Chez Collin  1809, 6 volumes. in-8°.

The chronological list below provides links to the Gallica basis of the Bibliothèque Nationale de France when the book is available in this database:

1748: Pharaon, tragedy in 5 acts and in verse, non performed.
1751: Zarès, tragedy in 5 acts and in verse, premiered at the Comédie-Française, 3 June (later renamed Ninus second)
1753–1756: Histoire des rois de Rome.
1754: Les Tuteurs, comedy in 2 acts and in verse, premiered at the Comédie-Française, 5 August.
1755: Le Cercle ou Les Originaux, comedy, premiered in the nouveau théâtre de Nancy, 26 November
1757: Petites lettres sur de grands philosophes.
1758: Le Barbier de Bagdad, comedy presented in the author's theatre in Argenteuil.
1760: Les Philosophe, comedy in 3 acts and in verse, premiered at the Comédie-Française, 2 May.
1762: Les Nouveaux Ménechmes, comedy in 5 acts in verse, (other titles: Le Rival par ressemblance ; Clerval et Cléon ; Les Méprises)
1764: La Dunciade française ou la Guerre des sots, satirical poem in three chants (later extended to 10 chants).
1770: Le Satirique ou l'Homme dangereux, comedy in 3 acts and in verse, given on the author's theatre in Argenteuil.
1775: Les Courtisanes ou l'École des mœurs, comedy in 3 acts and in verse.
1778: Éloge de Voltaire.
1771: Mémoires pour servir à l’histoire de la littérature depuis François Ier jusqu'à nos jours, 2 vol. (numerous reprints: 1775, 1803...)
1791: Questions importantes sur quelques opinions religieuses, (reprints: 1793, 1797)
1806: Le Génie de Voltaire apprécié dans tous ses ouvrages.

Bibliography 
 D. Delafarge, La Vie et l’œuvre de Palissot, Paris, 1912
 C. Duckworth, "Voltaire's L'Écossaise and Palissot's Les Philosophes : A strategic battle in a major war", Studies on Voltaire and the 18th century, Banbury (Oxfordshire), tome LXXXVII, 1972
 Hilde H. Freud, "Palissot and “Les Philosophes”", Diderot Studies, Geneva, vol IX, 1967
 H. Guénot, "Palissot, un ennemi de Diderot et des Philosophes", in Recherches sur Diderot et sur l'Encyclopédie, vol. 1, 1986
 E. Jovy, Palissot et Gobet, 1928
 G. Saintville, "Lettres de jeunesse de Palissot", in Mélanges Huguet, 1940, (p. 336–347)
 Jacques Truchet, Notice on Les Philosophes, in Théâtre du XVIIIe, Paris, Gallimard, Bibliothèque de la Pléiade, 1974, book II, (p. 1383–1395)
 C.F. Zeer, "Palissot and Voltaire", Modern Language Quarterly, December 1949.
 Hervé Guénot: "Charles Palissot de Montenoy (1730–1814)", in: Dictionnaire des journalistes (1600–1789).

References

External links 

 Charles Palissot de Montenoy, un opposant nancéien aux philosophes des "lumières"
 Palissot de Montenoy : un " ennemi " de Diderot et des philosophes

18th-century French dramatists and playwrights
French librarians
Counter-Enlightenment
Writers from Nancy, France
1730 births
1814 deaths
Burials at Père Lachaise Cemetery